The Eastern Thousand Buddha Caves is a series of rock cut Buddhist caves in Guazhou County, Gansu, northwest China. Of the twenty-three caves excavated from the conglomerate rock, eight have murals and sculptures dating from the Western Xia and Yuan dynasty; many of the statues were reworked during the Qing dynasty.  The caves extend in two tiers along the cliffs that flank both sides of a now dry river gorge, fourteen on the west bank (five with decoration) and nine on the east (three with decoration). Together with the Mogao Caves, Western Thousand Buddha Caves, Yulin Caves, and Five Temple Caves, the Eastern Thousand Buddha Caves is one of the five grotto sites in the vicinity of Dunhuang managed by the Dunhuang Academy.

Caves
Eight caves are decorated with murals and sculptures:

See also
 Major National Historical and Cultural Sites (Gansu)
 Principles for the Conservation of Heritage Sites in China
 Tiantishan Caves

References

External links
  Eastern Thousand Buddha Caves (Dunhuang Academy)

Buddhist grottoes in Gansu
Guazhou County
Western Xia architecture
Major National Historical and Cultural Sites in Gansu